Hestiochora is a genus of moths of the family Zygaenidae.

Species
Hestiochora continentalis Tarmann, 2005
Hestiochora erythrota Meyrick, 1886
Hestiochora furcata Tarmann, 2005
Hestiochora intermixta Tarmann, 2005
Hestiochora occidentalis Tarmann, 2005
Hestiochora queenslandensis Tarmann, 2005
Hestiochora tricolor (Walker, 1854)
Hestiochora xanthocoma Meyrick, 1886

References

Procridinae
Zygaenidae genera